Aphrodite is a 1982 softcore pornographic film directed by Robert Fuest. The film is inspired by the novel Aphrodite: mœurs antiques by Pierre Louÿs and stars Valérie Kaprisky and Horst Buchholz. The story follows a group of visitors who come to an island where they are involved in different sexual liaisons.

Aphrodite was the final theatrical film by Robert Fuest. The film was shot in a studio at Hauts-de-Seine in France. The film is a French-Swiss co-production between Films de la Tour and Scipion Films.

Aphrodite was released in France on 7 July 1982. The film was released in France on VHS in 1985.

Principal cast 
 Horst Buchholz as  Harry Laird 
 Valérie Kaprisky as Pauline 
 Delia Boccardo as Barbara 
 Capucine as Lady Suzanne Stanford 
 Catherine Jourdan as Valerie 
 Yves Massard as Baron Orloff 
 Daniel Beretta as  Mark   
 Monica Nickel as  Julie

Notes

External links 
 
 

1982 films
1982 drama films
1980s erotic drama films
1980s English-language films
1980s French-language films
English-language French films
English-language Swiss films
Films based on works by Pierre Louÿs
Films directed by Robert Fuest
Films set in 1914
Films set in the Mediterranean Sea
Films set on islands
Films shot in France
French erotic drama films
Seafaring films
Softcore pornography
Swiss drama films
French-language Swiss films
1980s French films